Smáralind is a shopping mall located in the Capital Region of Iceland. It is one of the biggest shopping malls in Iceland, with over ninety shops, restaurants and services. Designed by BDP and built by ÍSTAK, it was opened on 10 October 2001 at 10:10 GMT. Smáralind competes with other shopping centers of the Capital Region: Kringlan mall and Reykjavík's old city centre.

Shops 
The mall's anchor tenants are Hagkaup and H&M (where formerly Debenhams resided). Other major tenants are Zara and SmáraTívolí, a children's entertainment centre. The mall also houses a cinema. There are a number of well-known restaurants and cafés, including Subway, Pizza Hut, Sbarro, O'Learys, and T.G.I. Friday's among others.

Controversy 
Immediately after opening its resemblance to a giant phallus when viewed from the air created some notoriety.

See also 
 Kópavogur
 Kringlan
 Smáratorg Tower

External links

References 

Shopping malls in Reykjavík
Kópavogur
Shopping malls established in 2001
Buildings and structures in Capital Region (Iceland)
2001 establishments in Iceland